Dorobanțu may refer to places in Romania:

 Dorobanțu, Călărași, a commune in Călărași County
 Dorobanțu, Tulcea, a commune in Tulcea County
 Dorobanțu, a village in Nicolae Bălcescu Commune, Constanța County
 Dorobanțu, a village in Crângeni Commune, Teleorman County